Armen V. Kevorkian is an Armenian-American 
visual effects supervisor and television director. He is best known for his work on television series such as Ghost Whisperer, Hawaii Five-0, Banshee, The Flash, Supergirl, and Legends of Tomorrow. His accolades include a Primetime Emmy Award, a Visual Effects Society Award, and eight Leo Awards.

Career

Early career
Kevorkian began his career on Star Trek: Voyager, as a visual effects associate. He was with the series until its conclusion in 2001. He then merged to Star Trek: Enterprise, where he worked in effects for 70 episodes. He was then hired to coordinate visual effects for the two-part pilot of J. J. Abrams Lost. He went on to work for Abrams again on the final season of Alias. His first job as a supervisor came with ABCs new fall 2005 series Invasion. He worked in that capacity until the series was cancelled after its second season. He would go on to work as a supervisor on such series as Studio 60 on the Sunset Strip, Brothers & Sisters, Ghost Whisperer, Weeds, GCB, Castle, Unforgettable, Political Animals, The Newsroom, Ray Donovan, Homeland, Hawaii Five-0, The Tomorrow People and Lab Rats, As well as the pilots for Reckless, The Lottery, and The Mysteries of Laura. He won a Primetime Emmy Award for Outstanding Special Visual Effects in a Supporting Role for his work on the Cinemax series Banshee.

Arrowverse
Having worked for prolific producer Greg Berlanti on Brothers & Sisters, The Tomorrow People, and Political Animals, Kevorkian joined him yet again for his new Arrow spin-off The Flash. Working on the series, he gained fame and recognition for his visual achievements. In 2015, Kevorkian boarded Supergirl, which was initially broadcast on CBS and not a part of The CWs Arrowverse. However, after the conclusion of the first season, the series moved to the sibling network. In 2016, Kevorkian began work on Berlanti's next addition to the universe Legends of Tomorrow. The same year, he made his directorial debut, helming The Flashs second-season episode, "Rupture". He most recently directed the third episode of the third season, "Magenta". He was nominated for a Primetime Emmy Award in 2015 for his work on the episode "Grodd Lives" of the series.

Awards and nominations

References

External links

American television directors
American television producers
Living people
Date of birth missing (living people)
Emmy Award winners
Place of birth missing (living people)
Year of birth missing (living people)